Vote.org, formerly Long Distance Voter, is a nonpartisan 501(c)(3) non-profit organization that is based in the United States. It provides online voter guides for every state, including voter registration forms, absentee ballot applications, and information on deadlines, directions, and ID and residency requirements.

History 
Vote.org was founded as Long Distance Voter (LDV) in January 2008 by a group of professional investigators and voter advocates from Swing the State (a defunct voter mobility site) who sought to provide greater access to absentee voting information online. Though starting out with no full-time staff and only $5000 in outside funding, the organization grew in popularity over the early 2000s with 3 million visitors since launch and by becoming the chief data provider of Google's "How to Vote" project in 2014. This shift away from simply providing absentee ballot information to expanded civic participation incentives signaled a change in LDV's development toward what would become Vote.org.  
 
In April 2016, funded by Y Combinator- an American technology start-up accelerator- Long Distance Voter relaunched as Vote.org with funding with the explicit goal of reaching 100% voter turnout nationally.  In Fall 2016, Vote.org worked with Hustle to run a nationwide SMS peer-to-peer voter registration program in which they sent 3.8 million text messages to nearly 2.8 million low-propensity voters in the final two weeks, including over 980K on election day alone. A quantitative evaluation of this program found that polling location texting significantly both outperformed "make a plan" texting and a no-text control condition by 0.2%.

In March 2018, Vote.org initiated a campaign (now branded as electionday.org) which pushed for companies to adopt a number of pro-democracy pledges, including the forgoing of campaign contributions to lawmakers in support of restricted voter access, the support of Congress to the pass the For the People Act, John Lewis Rights Advancement Act, and D.C. statehood, as well as allow their employees time off to vote on Election Day. As of 2020, over 1000 companies had opted to participate, including Twitter, T-Mobile, Lyft, and Adidas. Also in 2016, Vote.org also launched its data research wing, which has partnered with Analyst Institute, Pantheon Analytics, and the Harvard Kennedy School of Government to conduct large-scale controlled experiments on the effectiveness of voter turnout campaigns.

In June 2020, Vote.org filed suit against Maine, in partnership with two citizens, the Alliance for Retired Americans, and  the American Civil Liberties Union of Maine, citing its inaccessible and out-of-date voting system. Some of the most prominent issues that Vote.org flagged in Maine's voting system were few voter registration options, a lack of prepaid postage, ballot collection hurdles, an Election Day receipt deadline, and rejection of absentee ballots that had technical defects. PopSugar reports that Vote.org was drawn to this lawsuit due to the state's diminishing voter turnouts- in 2020, Maine had the largest drop-off of voter registration since the beginning of the COVID-19 pandemic. In September 2020, Superior Court judge William Stokes rejected the lawsuit, citing that the suit took place too close to the actual election and any changes to ballot deadlines would be to the detriment of the state's electoral process and cause disruptions to results. The Alliance of Retired Americans now seek to file an appeal to Maine's Supreme Judicial Court.

Despite conflicts over their change in CEO and loss of donor support, Vote.org's development of numerous new digital and offline tools in 2020 yielded a number of important milestones for their organization. This included registering 34 million new voters, partnering with over 1,000 companies to allow time off work on Election Day, and feeding 40,500 voters by supplying food trucks to long voter lines. Vote.org's newest partnerships with tech companies like Propel, developer of the Fresh EBT app, allowed for 60,000 low-income participants of the Supplemental Nutrition Assistance Program to register to vote before the 2020 election.  This program expanded Vote.org's donor-base and cooperation with “Schusterman Family Foundation, Blue Meridian Partners, Flourish Ventures, Google.org, Flu Lab, Wend Collective, Blue Haven Initiative and The Late Show with Stephen Colbert. Other backers included a roster of celebrities and political figures, like Stacey Abrams, Andrew Yang, Julia Louis-Dreyfus, Ariana Grande and Camilla Luddington.”

Conflicts in the Organization 
In the summer of 2019, the organization's board terminated founder and CEO Debra Cleaver, citing "differences in opinion." Cleaver, who founded Long-Distance Voter, had a reported “cult of personality” among Silicon Valley executives- the main brunt of Vote.org's donors- based on her previous work in receiving a funding grant from the Knight Foundation. As reported by Vox, her style of leadership and mismanagement of resources led to her termination and subsequent replacement with now-CEO Andrea Hailey. Hailey, an Indianapolis native who founded the Civic Engagement Fund and the Town Hall Project as well as a Pollie Award recipient, began her work with Vote.org in 2010. Her status as CEO of the board was decided based on her previous experience in developing online media and fundraising campaigns with the Dr. Martin Luther King Memorial in 2007.

This contentious mishap resulted in losses in funding, including $4 million of promised funding from Sage Weil and a cancelled partnership with Viacom.

Current Work 
In 2021, Vote.org advocated for passing the For the People Act, a U.S. bill which expands automatic and same-day voter registration, voter access mail-in and online ballot infrastructure, and new limits on campaign spending. Specifically, Vote.org cooperated with Stacey Abrams and Michelle Obama's Fair Fight Action and When We All Vote campaigns targeting Georgia voter ID laws. Vote.org helped manage the drafting of a letter to Congress with the Declaration for American Democracy and 90 other corporations urging the passing of the For the People Act and the removal of Georgia ID laws. On March 3, 2021, the United States House of Representatives approved HR-1 with a 220–210 vote- however, on June 22, the Senate voted 50–50 to continue debate on the bill, lacking the simple majority for HR-1 to proceed to a vote. Also in 2021, Vote.org partnered with the CW network and the Lawyers' Committee for Civil Rights under law to launch the Freedom to Vote nonpartisan initiative, which aimed to increase content promoting voter registration and civic participation on a number of different platforms. This is an expansion of the CW's and Vote.org previous Vote Actually campaign in 2020, which promoted celebrities and corporations to support Vote.org resources ahead of the presidential election.

References

External links
 

501(c)(3) organizations
Organizations established in 2008
Voter turnout organizations
Y Combinator companies
Organizations based in the United States